Wacky Wednesday may refer to:

 Wacky Wednesday (book), a Dr. Seuss book
 Alternative title of the film Day Off